The 2020–21 Idaho State Bengals men's basketball team represented Idaho State University in the 2020–21 NCAA Division I men's basketball season. The Bengals, led by second-year head coach Ryan Looney, played their home games at Reed Gym in Pocatello, Idaho as members of the Big Sky Conference.  They finished the season 13-11, 8-6 in Big Sky Play to finish a tie for 4th place. They lost in the quarterfinals of the Big Sky tournament to Montana State.

Previous season
The Bengals finished the 2019–20 season 8–22, 4–16 Big Sky play to finish in a tie for tenth place. As the #11 seed in the Big Sky tournament, the Bengals upset the #6 seed Northern Arizona in the first round. They were scheduled to take on the #3 seed Montana in the quarterfinals, but due to the ongoing coronavirus pandemic, all postseason tournaments were canceled, including the remainder of the Big Sky tournament.

Roster

Schedule and results 

|-
!colspan=12 style=| Regular season

|-
!colspan=12 style=| Big Sky tournament
|-

|-

Source

References

Idaho State Bengals men's basketball seasons
Idaho State Bengals
Idaho State Bengals men's basketball
Idaho State Bengals men's basketball